Antônio Karabachian Araújo (born January 11, 1997), better known as Tom Karabachian, is a Brazilian actor.

Biography and career 
Karabachian was born in Rio de Janeiro, Brazil. He is the son of Brazilian singer Paulinho Moska and Nana Karabachian.

He began with a role in Louco por Elas, and later in Confissões de Adolescente. In 2016 he played a leading role in the film Fala Comigo, with Karine Teles and Denise Fraga. In 2018 he also starred as one of the leading characters of Malhação: Vidas Brasileiras.

Filmography

Television

Film

References

External links

1997 births
Living people
Male actors from Rio de Janeiro (city)
Brazilian people of Armenian descent
Brazilian male television actors
Brazilian male film actors
21st-century Brazilian male actors